Matthew Alexander Aitch (September 21, 1944 – April 4, 2007) was an American basketball player who played one season in the American Basketball Association (ABA)..

Early life 
Born in St. Louis, Missouri, Aitch played for Michigan State University. He was recruited out of Maplewood-Richmond Heights High School in suburban St. Louis by Cotton Fitzsimmons to play at Moberly Junior College, where Aitch was a nationally recognized star for two years. Aitch was recruited by Michigan State with Moberly teammate Shannon Reading, originally from Bowling Green, Missouri. The two former Greyhounds both started two seasons for the Spartans. Coach Fitzsimmons later won national junior college championships at Moberly in 1966 and 1967. Two stars from his 1967 team, Harrison Stepter and Bernard Copeland, were recruited by Michigan State and started both seasons they were Spartans.

Professional career 
Aitch was selected by the Detroit Pistons in the 13th round (135th overall pick) of the 1967 NBA draft. He played in 45 games in the ABA for Indiana Pacers in the 1967–68 season.

References

External links 

 Realgm.com Profile

1944 births
2007 deaths
American men's basketball players
Basketball players from St. Louis
Detroit Pistons draft picks
Indiana Pacers players
Michigan State Spartans men's basketball players
Moberly Greyhounds men's basketball players
Power forwards (basketball)